Florena Budwin (or Florina Budwin) ( – January 25, 1865) was a Union Army soldier from Philadelphia who, disguised as a man, enlisted with her husband, an artillery captain, in the Civil War in order to stay with him. After being captured, she died of complications of pneumonia. She was buried in Florence National Cemetery, the first woman soldier to be afforded that honor.

Sometime after February 1864, she was captured and confined at the Confederacy's most notoriously brutal prisoner of war concentration camp, Andersonville shortly after it was created. Some reports state that her husband died at Andersonville by a prison guard. However, Budwin herself stated that her husband died in battle, after which she was captured. A soldier who saw her there (Samuel Elliott, 7th Penna. Reserves) described her as "a woman rather above the medium height, sunburnt, with long, unkempt hair. Her clothing consisted of a rough gray shirt, a pair of worn-out army trousers, and what was once a military cap." She remained at Andersonville until it was threatened by Union forces, and was then transferred to the Florence Stockade in Florence, South Carolina in the fall. There, she attended to sick prisoners until she herself became ill with pneumonia in the winter; when Dr. Josephus Hall gave her medical attention, he discovered her sex, after which Budwin was given special treatment, including donations of food, clothing from local women, and her own room. However, she died shortly thereafter at the age of 20 on January 25, 1865, less than a month before sick Union prisoners of war were released by the Confederacy. Budwin's decision to keep her sex a secret during her prison time likely cost her life and her reasons for doing so are unknown. In fact, little is known about her military service except for her time in prison. Florena Budwin may not even have been her real name.

An estimated 16,000 Union prisoners were held captive in the Florence Prison Stockade between September 1864 and February 1865. In that short period of time, 2,738 prisoners died from malnutrition and disease. The owner of a plantation adjacent to the prison allowed the dead to be buried in trenches on his property. This area was later established as the Florence National Cemetery. A plain marble headstone there bears Florena's name and the date of her death. She is believed to be the first woman to be buried in a national cemetery.

See also
 List of female American Civil War soldiers
 Timeline of women in war in the United States, pre-1945

References

 Sifakis. Who Was Who in the Civil War, page 86
 Blakey, Arch Fredric. General John Windor, C.S.A, page 4

External links
 Detailed and referenced site listing Florena Budwin and many other women who served in the American Civil War

Year of birth uncertain
Place of birth unknown
1840s births
1865 deaths
Female wartime cross-dressers in the American Civil War
Women in the United States Army
People of Pennsylvania in the American Civil War
Military personnel from Philadelphia
American Civil War prisoners of war
Union Army soldiers
Union military personnel killed in the American Civil War
Deaths from pneumonia in Georgia (U.S. state)